Brenna Marie Lovera (born March 12, 1997) is an American soccer player who currently plays for Besta-deild kvenna club Selfoss. She played college soccer for the Northwestern Wildcats and was named to the All-Big Ten Second Team in 2018.

Lovera joined ÍBV in July 2019. In 9 matches for ÍBV, she scored 6 goals.

After playing for Boavista in Portugal in 2020, Lovera returned to Iceland and signed with Selfoss in March 2021. She had a standout season for Selfoss, winning the Golden Boot with 13 goals in 16 matches.

She signed a two-year contract extension with Selfoss in September 2021. On June 10, 2022, she scored a hat-trick in a 4–1 win against Þór/KA in the Icelandic Cup.

References

External links

Profile at Northwestern University

Living people
1997 births
American expatriate sportspeople in Iceland
American women's soccer players
ÍBV women's football players
Northwestern Wildcats women's soccer players
Selfoss women's football players
Úrvalsdeild kvenna (football) players
Women's association football forwards
Expatriate women's footballers in Portugal
American expatriate sportspeople in Portugal
Campeonato Nacional de Futebol Feminino players
Boavista F.C. (women) players